In music, Op. 30 stands for Opus number 30. Compositions that are assigned this number include:

 Beethoven – Violin Sonata No. 6
 Beethoven – Violin Sonata No. 7
 Beethoven – Violin Sonata No. 8
 Boccherini – Musica notturna delle strade di Madrid
 Braunfels – Die Vögel
 Chopin – Mazurkas, Op. 30
 Coleridge-Taylor – The Song of Hiawatha
 Enescu – Piano Quartet No. 2
 Farrenc – Piano Quintet No. 1
 Górecki – Two Sacred Songs, Op. 30
 Hanson – Symphony No. 2
 Mendelssohn - Songs without Words, Book II
 Myaskovsky – Symphony No. 10
 Rachmaninoff – Piano Concerto No. 3
 Reizenstein – Anna Kraus
 Rimsky-Korsakov – Piano Concerto
 Saint-Saëns – La princesse jaune
 Schumann – 3 Gedichte
 Scriabin – Piano Sonata No. 4
 Sibelius – Islossningen i Uleå älv
 Strauss – Also sprach Zarathustra
 Tchaikovsky – String Quartet No. 3